Flogger  may refer to:

 Mikoyan-Gurevich MiG-23 "Flogger", a Russian fighter aircraft
 Mikoyan MiG-27 "Flogger-D/J", a Russian ground-attack aircraft
 Flogger (fashion), a teenage fashion originated in Argentina
 Someone who administers a flogging, or the device used for that purpose
 In the context of BDSM, a multi-tailed scourge typically made of soft leather

See also
Flog (disambiguation)